The 1958 Cornell Big Red football team was an American football team that represented Cornell University as a member of the Ivy League during the 1958 NCAA University Division football season. 

In its 12th season under head coach George K. James, the team compiled a 6–3 record and outscored opponents 147 to 135. Bob Hazzard was the team captain. 

Cornell's 5–2 conference record tied for second place in the Ivy League. The Big Red outscored Ivy opponents 134 to 80. 

Cornell played its home games at Schoellkopf Field in Ithaca, New York.

Schedule

References

Cornell
Cornell Big Red football seasons
Cornell Big Red football